Kevin Curren and David Pate were the defending champions but lost in the second round to Amos Mansdorf and Mikael Pernfors.

Paul Annacone and Christo van Rensburg won in the final 7–6, 6–7, 6–1 against Scott Davis and Tim Wilkison.

Seeds
All eight seeded teams received byes to the second round.

Draw

Final

Top half

Bottom half

External links
 1989 Volvo U.S. National Indoor Doubles Draw

U.S. National Indoor Championships
1989 Grand Prix (tennis)